Sinocrossocheilus is a genus of cyprinid fish endemic to fast-flowing rivers in China and sometimes found in caves. There are two described species in this genus.

Species
 Sinocrossocheilus guizhouensis H. W. Wu, 1977
 Sinocrossocheilus labiatus R. F. Su, J. X. Yang & G. H. Cui, 2003

References
 

Cyprinidae genera
Cyprinid fish of Asia
Freshwater fish of China